Joshua Daniel Ruiz Castillo (born 1997) is a Colombian chess player. He was awarded the title of Grandmaster by FIDE in 2019.

Chess career
Ruiz Castillo won the Colombian Chess Championship in 2014, becoming the youngest Colombian champion ever.

In 2017, he competed in the FIDE World Cup, and was knocked out by Wesley So in the first round. In 2019, Ruiz Castillo earned the title Grandmaster (GM) after his Elo rating exceeded 2500 during the Master Open Alekhine Memorial tournament in Russia. He achieved the norms required for the title at the Central American and Caribbean Junior Championships of 2012 and 2013, where he took the gold medal on both occasions, and at the L.A.B. GM norm tournament in Bogotá 2012.

References

External links
 
 
 

1997 births
Living people
Colombian chess players
Chess grandmasters
People from Bogotá
Date of birth missing (living people)
21st-century Colombian people